André Vadon (born in Marseille, on 22 July 1934), is a French former rugby league footballer who played as hooker.

Career
Debuting for Cavaillon, he made his first steps at the French Championship. He was later called up for the conscription and plays for Bataillon de Joinville for two years. Subsequently, Vadon joined the Albi club, where he constituted a formidable forward pack alongside Guy Berthomieu, Jean-Marie Bez, Marcel Bescos and Honoré Conti. For three times he disputed the French Championship final winning two titles in 1958 and 1962 and losing one in 1960 against Roanne with its top players Jean Barthe and Claude Mantoulan. In 1966, he returned to Cavaillon following Geroges Fages, to end his career.

Scouted very soon, he was a junior international for France in March 1954 Jean Vergès (XIII Catalan), Gilbert Alberti (Carcassonne), Georges Fages (Albi), Jean Rouqueirol (Avignon) and his teammates for Cavaillon René Ovili et Jean Leydier.
Before a tour of France, Vadon was deemed responsible of pushing a referee Vic Belsham, who collided with Alain Perducat. Said incident made Vadon and Perducat from banned from returning to New Zealand.
After his sports career, Vadon occupies important roles at FFR XIII. In 1978, he was appointed for the coaching staff of the French national team alongside Roger Garrigue, Pierre Escourrou and José Calle, until 1981, alongside Michel Maïque, Francis Lévy and Jean-Pierre Clar.
Thanks to his club-level performances, he represented France between 1956 and 1961, taking part at the 1960 Rugby League World Cup.

Personal life
Outside the pitch, he worked as farmer.

Honours

As player
Team honours :
French Champion  in 1958 and 1962 (Albi)
Runner-up at the French Championship : 1960 (Toulouse).

References

External links
Andre Vadon profile at rugbyleagueproject.com

1934 births
Living people
French rugby league coaches
France national rugby league team players
Sportspeople from Marseille
Racing Club Albi XIII players
Rugby league hookers
French rugby league players